Humaria hemisphaerica, commonly known as the hairy fairy cup or the brown-haired fairy cup, is a species of fungi in the family Pyronemataceae. This mycorrhizal fungus is recognized by its white inner surface and hairy brown outer surface. The specific epithet is derived from the Latin word hemisphaericum, meaning half a sphere.

Taxonomy

This species was originally described by Swedish mycologist Elias Magnus Fries in 1823 as Peziza hemisphaerica. He considered it to be one of the Lachnia, a name he applied to cup fungi with   hairy apothecia. In 1870 Leopold Fuckel transferred P. hemisphaerica to the genus Humaria.

Description

The fruiting bodies are initially spherical and expand to become cuplike at the fungus matures. This species typically does not have a stipe―when it does, it is present as a small abrupt base. The inner surface of the fruiting body (the hymenium) is white, while the outer hairy surface is brown and covered with brown hairs that taper to a sharp point. These hairs are 400–500 x 15–20 μm. The ascospores are elliptical, hyaline, 20–22 x 10–11 μm, and have 2–3 oil droplets. The hairy fairy cup is inedible.

Habitat

Humaria hemisphaerica grows solitary, scattered, or in groups on the ground or sometimes on rotten wood in wooded areas. It is common in the Pacific Northwest.

Similar species

There are several other cup fungi with hairy exteriors that may be confused with H. hemisphaerica. Jafnea semitotsa is larger (2–5 cm diameter) with a brown interior and a short stipe. Trichophaea boudieri and Trichophaea bullata are smaller (1–6 mm diameter).Trichophaea abundans is another small species that prefers to grow in burned areas.

References

External links
Index Fungorum

Pyronemataceae
Fungi of Europe
Fungi described in 1870
Inedible fungi